"Escape" is a song written by Enrique Iglesias, Steve Morales, Kara DioGuardi, and David Siegel for Iglesias' fifth studio album, Escape (2001). The song is the album's opening track, and was released as its second single on 28 January 2002. The song reached number three in the UK and number 12 on the US Billboard Hot 100. A Spanish version of the song, titled "Escapar", reached number nine in Iglesias's native Spain.

Music and lyrics
"Escape" composed in common time and in the key of B major, with the entire song consisting of a I–IV–vi–V chord progression loop. It is written in verse-chorus form, and its instrumentation comes from the electric guitar and keyboard. The song moves at a tempo of 126 beats per minute. Enrique Iglesias' vocals span from F4 to D6.

Music video

The song's music video was directed by Dave Meyers and filmed in the Long Beach Performing Arts Center and the CityWalk shopping area in Universal City, California. It features Iglesias and tennis-player Anna Kournikova (whom he would later propose to) as his love interest. The video opens with a sequence of Iglesias performing the song, backed by a live band, in front of a huge crowd in a theater. Throughout the video, there are sequences of Iglesias and Kournikova's relationship. The first sequence is of Iglesias driving through a busy city on a motorbike while Kournikova awaits his arrival. Once he arrives, he attempts to kiss her but she pushes him away.

In the next scene Iglesias follows Kournikova into the ladies room. She catches his eye in the mirror and turns around to kiss him. They continue kissing while sprawled across the bathroom sinks until two security guards pull them apart and take Iglesias away. The scene soon cuts to another scene where another security guard pulls up in a carpark and spots them kissing while lying across the front seats of a car. But, unlike the previous security guards, he leaves them undisturbed and drives away. The video closes with a scene of the theater being emptied, but Kournikova stands and waits in her seat until Iglesias comes over to her after the crowd has left.

"Escape" premiered on MTV's top-10 chart program Total Request Live on 30 January 2002, where it reached number one. It was Iglesias's first video to retire from the chart at number one. After its 8 February debut on MuchMusic's Countdown, it reached number one for the week of 19 April.

Live performances
Enrique first performed the song at the NBA All Star Read to Achieve Celebration 9 February 2002, followed by a performance on The Late Show with David Letterman on 11 February. He also performed on MTV's Fashionably Loud on 19 February and on The Tonight Show with Jay Leno on 18 April 2002. He would perform the song alongside "Hero" at that year's World Music Awards, and in the UK, he would perform the song as a duet with Lulu in her An Audience with... and solo on Michael Parkinson's talk show.

Track listings

 Spanish CD single
 "Escapar" (album version)
 "Escape" (album version)

 Spanish enhanced CD single
 "Escapar" (album version)
 "Escape" (album version)
 "Escape" (StoneBridge radio mix)
 "Hero" (Thunderpuss remix)
 "Hero" (video)

 European CD single
 "Escape" (album version)
 "Escape" (Boogieman remix)

 UK CD1
 "Escape" (album version) – 3:28
 "Escape" (Thunderpuss club mix) – 9:36
 Enrique interview footage

 UK CD2
 "Escape" (album version) – 3:28
 "Escape" (Giorgio Moroder & Fernando Garibay club mix) – 7:44
 "Escape" (StoneBridge radio mix version) – 4:30
 "Escape" (video)

 UK cassette single
 "Escape" (album version) – 3:28
 "Escape" (Giorgio Moroder & Fernando Garibay club mix) – 7:44

 Australian CD single
 "Escape" (album version)
 "Escape" (Boogieman remix)
 "Escape" (StoneBridge radio mix)
 "Hero" (Thunderpuss remix)
 "Hero" (enhanced video)

Credits and personnel
Credits are lifted from the Escape album booklet.

Studios
 Recorded at Hit Factory Criteria (Miami, Florida)
 Mastered at Bernie Grundman Mastering Studio (Hollywood, California)

Personnel

 Enrique Iglesias – writing, vocals, co-production, vocal production
 Steve Morales – writing, background vocals, production, vocal production
 Kara DioGuardi – writing, background vocals, vocal production
 David Siegel – writing, keyboards
 Aaron Fishbein – electric guitar
 Sebastian Krys – mixing
 Shane Stoner – engineering
 Fabian Marasciullo – engineering
 Marc Lee – assistant engineering
 Ivy Skoff – production coordination
 Brian Gardner – mastering

Charts and certifications

Weekly charts

Year-end charts

Certifications

Release history

See also
 List of number-one dance hits (United States)

References

External links
 Enrique Iglesias official website
 "Escape" Music video
 Escape audio

2001 songs
2002 singles
Enrique Iglesias songs
Interscope Records singles
Music videos directed by Dave Meyers (director)
Songs written by David Siegel (musician)
Songs written by Enrique Iglesias
Songs written by Kara DioGuardi
Songs written by Steve Morales